Arabica is a peer-review academic journals of Arab studies founded in 1954 by Evariste Lévi-Provençal. The journal has been published by Brill Publishers since 1980. It is currently edited by Jean-Charles Coulon, and was in the past edited by Mohammed Arkoun.

Abstracting and indexing
The journal is abstracted and indexed in the following bibliographic databases:

According to Scopus, it has a 2020 CiteScore of 0.7, ranking 60th out of 845 journals in the category "Literature and Literary Theory".

References

External links

Publications established in 1954
Area studies journals
Brill Publishers academic journals
Multilingual journals
English-language journals
French-language journals